Brace Yourself for the Mediocre is the first and only album of the band Roper, released October 19, 2004. It was put together by lead singer Reese Roper before he had put the rest of the band together. The album has a pop punk sound, although HM comments that it "has much more in common with the raw side than... with Simple Plan or Relient K.

The albums contains lyrics that avoid the clichés of pop punk and deliver scathing wit alongside representations of faith, typical of Reese Roper.

Track listing
"Hello Lamewads" – 3:16
"You're With Stupid" – 2:27
"Amplify" – 3:59
"Vendetta" – 3:47
"Red Eye to Miami" – 2:56
"Quicksilver" – 3:21
"1985" – 3:20
"Say Sayonara" – 3:32
"How Your Halo Fell" – 3:30
"Day of Pigs" – 2:37
"Fireflies" – 3:28
"You're Still The One" (Shania Twain cover) – 2:57
"In Excelsis Deo" – 3:42

Personnel 
Additional Music
 Drums: Frank Lenz, Jason White
 Bass: Elijah Thomson
 Organ: Phil Bennett
 Guitar: Bob Schiveley, Ethan Luck

Additional Vocals
Adam Davis
Sam Hernandez
Mick Leonardi
Justin McRoberts
Eli Salazar
Dennis Simmons
Jason White
Dan Romero
Illustrations: Barak Hardley

Touring Band Lineup
Reese Roper: Vocals, Nord
Jonathan Till: Bass Guitar
Jonathan Byrnside: Lead Guitar
Matt "emo" Emmett: Rhythm Guitar, Backup Vocals
Nick White: Drums

Charts 
Album - Billboard (North America)

References

External links 
 Barak Hardley's Site

2004 debut albums
Reese Roper albums